Jeziorak is a lake in the Iława Lake District in Warmia-Masuria, Poland. Its area is 3,219 ha (including 20 islands with area of 240 ha). It is 27.45 km long and 2.4 km wide. Maximum depth is 13 m.  It is the longest lake in Poland, and ranks 6th by area.

Geology
The lake was formed by filling a glacial tunnel valley.

Gallery

References

Lakes of Poland
Lakes of Warmian-Masurian Voivodeship